The xartcollection was created in 1968 in Zollikofen, Zurich, Switzerland by Sandro Bocola and three partners: Heinz Bütler, Rolf Fehlbaum and Erwin Meierhofer.

Xartcollection's concept was to industrially produce three-dimensional “Multiples” in limited and signed editions. The company's philosophy was to make contemporary Art available to a large public and its “Multiples” were sold worldwide in art galleries, design- and furniture stores namely at “Wohnbedarf” in Switzerland.

Internationally renowned artists such as Max Bill, Getulio Alviani, Richard Hamilton (artist), Allen Jones (sculptor), Joe Tilson, Peter Phillips (artist) and others participated in this project. Most of xartcollection's "Multiples" were produced by the firm of Reif, Relo-Kunststoffe in Lörrach, Germany. 
In 1971 xartcollection also created "Xart Walls" which industrially produced wallpapers designed by known artists such as Jean Tinguely, Niki de Saint Phalle. The "Xart Walls" where manufactured by the firm "Marburg Wallcoverings" in Kirchhain, Germany.

Despite its international reputation the company went bankrupt and was dissolved in 1973.

Exhibitions
1969 Xartcollection Multiples, Beylerian Gallery, New York City
1969 Xartcollection, Galerie Ursula Lichter, Frankfurt am Main
1969 Xartcollection Multiples, Bruno Bischofberger Gallery, Zürich 
1969 [serigrafien verschiedener künstler und objekte der xartcollection] at Stoll Wohnbedarf, Köln 
1970 "Multiple Art" Marlborough Gallery, New York City 
1970 "New Multiple Art" at the White Chapel Art Gallery, London 
1970 "xartcollection" stand at the Art Basel, Switzerland 
1970 [unknown Exhibitiontitle] at Ben Wagins Galerie S, West-Berlin
1970 "Xartcollection 1971" at Galerie G, Basel
1971 "Multiples - the first decade" Philadelphia Museum of Art, Philadelphia 
1973 "xart collection - xart wall" at Stoll Wohnbedarf, Köln
1974 "Multiples" Neuer Berliner Kunstverein, Berlin
1975 "multipels xartcollection" Stoll Wohnbedarf, Köln
1992 "Three or More" - Multiplied Art from Duchamp to the present - Wacoal Art Center of Spiral Garden, Tokyo

References

Sources
Google book search results on xartcollection
Richard Hamilton, "Guggenheim" Multiple for xartcollection on the British Council website
"Xart Walls" (1972), xartcollection wallpapers produced by Marburg Wallcoverings

Digital art
Modern art
Pop art